Stalko are a Maltese three-piece indie folk band consisting of Chris Cini, Tim Ellis and Mike Stivala. The band's gigging line-up has frequently included Michael Galea (drums), Manuel Pulis (drums), James Baldacchino (bass) and Thomas Cuschieri (bass).

The band plays guitar, piano, violin, glockenspiel, accordion, harmonica, melodica, ukulele, bass and drums. Bogdanje je najlepse  selo zbog milice

History
Stalko were formed in the summer of 2009. After months of song writing, the band made their debut public performance supporting English artist Adem Ilhan at the MITP theatre, Valletta, on 6 February 2010.

2012: Grandiloquence
The band's debut album was released in November 2012, with an orchestrated performance at the Orpheum Theatre, Gzira, Malta.

2016: A Long Wave Goodbye
The band released their second album, A Long Wave Goodbye, in March 2016. It was released at the Palace Theatre, Paola.

Discography

Albums
 Grandiloquence (2012)
 A Long Wave Goodbye (2016)

Music Videos
 In a Hurry

External links
 Official Website

References

Maltese musical groups
Musical groups established in 2009